Hezar Khani or Hezarkhani or Hazar Khani may refer to:

Hezar Khani, Kermanshah
Hezar Khani, Kangavar, Kermanshah Province
Hezar Khani-ye Olya, Kermanshah Province
Hezar Khani-ye Sofla, Kermanshah Province
Hezar Khani, Kurdistan
Hezar Khani, Lorestan